Mohammed Ghous Mosque, also known as Mosque of Muhammad Ghous Gwaliori or Shattari or Ek Toda Mosque, is a medieval mosque in Sarangpur area of Ahmedabad, India.

History
The mosque was built in 1562 by the Sufi saint Sheikh Mohammed Ghaus of Gwalior. He stayed in Ahmedabad for ten years and preached Sufi Shattari tradition. His son Sheikh Uwais also preached until 16th century.

Architecture
The mosque represents Jaunpuri style of Indo-Islamic architecture. There are two rows of pillars which are connected by arches. The arches support flat domes of the mosque. There are two octagonal minarets at the ends of the façade. The northern minaret is complete where southern minaret is broken from one story above the roof level. The northern minaret has five balconies alternating with gaps.

Gallery

References 

Mosques in Ahmedabad
Religious buildings and structures completed in 1562